Gunnard Winston Twyner (born July 14, 1973) is a former American football wide receiver in the National Football League who played for the Cincinnati Bengals and New Orleans Saints. He played college football for the Western Illinois Leathernecks. He also played in the Arena Football League for the Tampa Bay Storm and Buffalo Destroyers/Columbus Destroyers.

Twyner is currently a coach for the Indianapolis Colts. Prior to that he was a coach at Dodge City Community College.

References

1973 births
Living people
American football wide receivers
Cincinnati Bengals players
New Orleans Saints players
Tampa Bay Storm players
Buffalo Destroyers players
Columbus Destroyers players
Western Illinois Leathernecks football players
Players of American football from Iowa
People from Bettendorf, Iowa